The 2013–14 Louisville Cardinals women's basketball team represented the University of Louisville during the 2013–14 NCAA Division I women's basketball season. The Cardinals, led by seventh-year head coach Jeff Walz, played their home games at the KFC Yum! Center and were in their first and only year in the American Athletic Conference. The school joined the Atlantic Coast Conference in July 2014.

Roster

Schedule

|-
!colspan=9 style="background:#ad0000; color:#fff;"| Exhibition

|-
!colspan=9 style="background:#ad0000; color:#fff;"| Regular Season

|-
!colspan=9 style="background:#ad0000; color:#fff;"| American Athletic Conference Women's Tournament

|-
!colspan=9 style="background:#ad0000; color:#fff;"| NCAA Women's Tournament

See also
2013–14 Louisville Cardinals men's basketball team

References

Louisville Cardinals women's basketball seasons
Louisville
Louisville
Louisville Cardinals women's basketball, 2013-14
Louisville Cardinals women's basketball, 2013-14